Haliclona oculata, sometimes known by the common name mermaid’s glove, is a species of sea sponges that is found in depths from 4m to approx 1,000 m.

Distribution
Haliclona oculata is found in the North Atlantic Ocean and also in South Africa.

Description
Haliclona oculata grows to a size of about 30 cm and has a soft texture.

Ecology
This species feeds on particles in the water.

References

External links
 http://pioneerunion.ca.schoolwebpages.com
 https://www.itis.gov
 http://www.catalogueoflife.org

Animals described in 1776
oculata
Taxa named by Peter Simon Pallas